The following is a list of the 27 cantons of the Finistère department, in France, following the French canton reorganisation which came into effect in March 2015:

 Brest-1
 Brest-2
 Brest-3
 Brest-4
 Brest-5
 Briec
 Carhaix-Plouguer
 Concarneau
 Crozon
 Douarnenez
 Fouesnant
 Guipavas
 Landerneau
 Landivisiau
 Lesneven
 Moëlan-sur-Mer
 Morlaix
 Plabennec
 Plonéour-Lanvern
 Plouigneau
 Pont-de-Buis-lès-Quimerch
 Pont-l'Abbé
 Quimper-1
 Quimper-2
 Quimperlé
 Saint-Pol-de-Léon
 Saint-Renan

References